Sequential quadratic programming (SQP) is an iterative method for constrained nonlinear optimization. SQP methods are used on mathematical problems for which the objective function and the constraints are twice continuously differentiable.

SQP methods solve a sequence of optimization subproblems, each of which optimizes a quadratic model of the objective subject to a linearization of the constraints. If the problem is unconstrained, then the method reduces to Newton's method for finding a point where the gradient of the objective vanishes.  If the problem has only equality constraints, then the method is equivalent to applying Newton's method to the first-order optimality conditions, or Karush–Kuhn–Tucker conditions, of the problem.

Algorithm basics
Consider a nonlinear programming problem of the form:

The Lagrangian for this problem is

At an iterate , a basic sequential quadratic programming algorithm defines an appropriate search direction  as a solution to the quadratic programming subproblem

Note that the term  in the expression above may be left out for the minimization problem, since it is constant under the  operator.

Alternative approaches
 Sequential linear programming
 Sequential linear-quadratic programming
 Augmented Lagrangian method

Implementations
SQP methods have been implemented in well known numerical environments such as MATLAB and GNU Octave. There also exist numerous software libraries, including open source:

 SciPy (de facto standard for scientific Python) has scipy.optimize.minimize(method=’SLSQP’) solver.
 NLopt (C/C++ implementation, with numerous interfaces including Julia, Python, R, MATLAB/Octave), implemented by Dieter Kraft as part of a package for optimal control, and modified by S. G. Johnson.
 LabVIEW
 KNITRO (C, C++, C#, Java, Python, Julia, Fortran)
 NPSOL (Fortran)
 SNOPT (Fortran)
 NLPQL (Fortran)
 MATLAB
SuanShu (Java)

See also
 Newton's method
 Secant method

Notes

References

External links
  Sequential Quadratic Programming at NEOS guide

Optimization algorithms and methods